Carlos F. Lucero (born November 23, 1940) is an American attorney and jurist serving as a senior United States circuit judge of the United States Court of Appeals for the Tenth Circuit.

Early life and education 

Lucero was born in Antonito, Colorado. He received a Bachelor of Arts degree from Adams State College in 1961 and a Juris Doctor from the George Washington University Law School in 1964.

Career 
Lucero served as a law clerk for Judge William E. Doyle of the United States District Court for the District of Colorado from 1964 to 1965. He worked in private practice of law in Alamosa, Colorado from 1966 to 1995. He was an adjunct professor of legal studies at Adams State College from 1968 to 1995. He served as the first Hispanic President of the Colorado Bar Association.

Federal judicial service  
Lucero was nominated by President Bill Clinton on March 23, 1995, to the United States Court of Appeals for the Tenth Circuit, to a new seat created by 104 Stat. 5089. He was confirmed by the United States Senate on June 30, 1995, and received commission the same day. Lucero was the first Hispanic Judge to sit on the Tenth Circuit. He maintained his chambers in Denver, Colorado. He assumed senior status on February 1, 2021.

On June 25, 2014, Lucero wrote the majority opinion for the Kitchen v. Herbert case, which strikes down Utah's same-sex marriage ban as unconstitutional.

See also
List of Hispanic/Latino American jurists
List of first minority male lawyers and judges in Colorado

References

External links

1940 births
Living people
Adams State University alumni
George Washington University Law School alumni
Hispanic and Latino American judges
Judges of the United States Court of Appeals for the Tenth Circuit
People from Conejos County, Colorado
United States court of appeals judges appointed by Bill Clinton
20th-century American judges
21st-century American judges